The Rovers was an Australian ocean-based family adventure television show originally screened from 21 August 1969  until 12 June 1970 and was broadcast on the 0-Ten network, the precursor of Network Ten

Synopsis
Produced by NLT Productions, executive producer was  Bill Harmon and producer Don Cash, who would become famous for creating  Number 96. The series starred Rowena Wallace, Edward Hepple, Noel Trevarthen and child actor Grant Seiden.

The storylines revolve around the adventures of the crew of the ‘Pacific Lady’, an island schooner owned by Captain Sam McGill (or ‘Cap’ for short), played by Hepple, Bob Wild (a freelance photographer) played by Trevarthen and Rusty Collins, a wildlife journalist (played by Wallace).

Thirty-nine episodes of 30 minutes each were produced on color film with an eye to distributing in overseas markets like Skippy the Bush Kangaroo. Writers included Kenneth Cook, Michael Latimer, Ron McLean, Michael Wright, Ralph Peterson and Rosamund Waring.

Ron Randell, who was in Australia performing in stage plays, guest starred in some episodes.

Notes

References
Classic Australian Television - The Rovers accessed 26 April 2009
Memorable TV The TV Shows (1970's) The Rovers accessed 26 April 2009

External links
The Rovers at AustLit
The Rovers at National Film and Sound Archive

Network 10 original programming
1969 Australian television series debuts
1970 Australian television series endings
Australian children's television series
Television shows set in New South Wales
Black-and-white Australian television shows